Joseph Francis Hannan (1873 – 14 March 1943) was an Australian politician and trade unionist. Hannan was probably born in Yorkshire, England and emigrated with his family in 1888.  He soon became involved in the union movement and was a member of the committee of the Melbourne Trades Hall Council that established the Political Labor Council of Victoria in 1900. In 1903, he married  Agnes Theresa Phelan.  He became president of the Victorian branch of the Labor Party in 1911.

Hannan stood unsuccessfully against George Fairbairn for the seat of Fawkner at the 1910 election, but defeated him at the 1913 election. He lost the seat at the 1917 election, due to his opposition to conscription. In 1918 he won a by-election for the Victorian Legislative Assembly seat of Albert Park, but resigned in 1919 to unsuccessfully contest Fawkner at the 1919 election.  In 1924, he was appointed to fill a casual vacancy in the Senate, but was not returned at the 1925 election. He also unsuccessfully contested the assembly seat of Castlemaine and Kyneton in 1927 and Albert Park in 1932, and stood for the Federal seats of Kooyong the 1928 election and Flinders at the 1934 election without success.

After leaving politics Hannan became a commercial traveller.   He was survived by two daughters and a son.

Hannan is buried in the Roman Catholic section of Coburg Cemetery with his wife, daughter Veronica and two infant grandsons. His grave is included in a self-guided heritage walk at the cemetery and information about his life is available on a sign posted at his graveside.

Notes

Members of the Australian House of Representatives for Fawkner
Members of the Australian House of Representatives
Members of the Australian Senate for Victoria
Members of the Australian Senate
Victoria (Australia) state politicians
Australian Labor Party members of the Parliament of Australia
English emigrants to colonial Australia
1873 births
1943 deaths
20th-century Australian politicians
Politicians from Yorkshire